is a railway station in the city of Ishinomaki, Miyagi, Japan, operated by East Japan Railway Company (JR East).

Lines
Hebita Station is served by the Senseki Line (including the Senseki-Tōhoku Line). It is located 46.6 kilometers from the terminus of the Senseki Line at Aoba-dōri Station.

Station layout
The station has one side platform serving a single bidirectional track. The station is unstaffed.

History
Hebita Station opened on November 22, 1928 as a station on the Miyagi Electric Railway. The Miyagi Electric Railway was nationalized on May 1, 1944. The station was absorbed into the JR East network upon the privatization of JNR on April 1, 1987. The station was closed from March 11, 2011 due to damage to the line associated with the 2011 Tōhoku earthquake and tsunami.

Surrounding area

 Hebita Post Office

See also
 List of railway stations in Japan

References

External links

 

Stations of East Japan Railway Company
Railway stations in Miyagi Prefecture
Senseki Line
Railway stations in Japan opened in 1928
Ishinomaki